Monro MacCloskey (May 28, 1902 – January 29, 1983) was a Brigadier General in the United States Air Force.

Early life
MacCloskey was born on May 28, 1902, at Fort Worden to Brigadier General Manus MacCloskey and Sara Monro.

Military career

MacCloskey graduated from the United States Military Academy at West Point in 1924 and joined the Field Artillery in the United States Army as a Second Lieutenant. He resigned his commission in 1929 but joined the Air Corps of the National Guard. He was called up for active duty in February 1941.

During World War II, he served with the Twelfth Air Force and the Mediterranean Air Command before assuming command of the 885th Bombardment Squadron and the 2641st Special Group.

Following the war, he was assigned to the Pentagon and was named air attaché in Paris, France.  His later commands included the 28th Air Division. MacCloskey was a close friend of Air Force Chief of Staff Hoyt Vandenberg, and assisted in the organization of Vandenberg's funeral in 1954.

MacCloskey's retirement from the Air Force was effective as of July 1, 1957. He then joined the Avco Manufacturing Company at their Crosley Broadcasting Corporation division.

Awards
The awards he received during his career included the Silver Star, the Legion of Merit, the Distinguished Flying Cross, the Air Medal with silver oak leaf cluster and two bronze oak leaf clusters, as well as the Croix de Guerre and the Legion of Honour of France.

Death and legacy
He died on January 29, 1983, in  Washington, District of Columbia. He was buried at Arlington National Cemetery alongside his father.

References

People from Jefferson County, Washington
United States Air Force generals
United States Army officers
Recipients of the Silver Star
Recipients of the Legion of Merit
Recipients of the Distinguished Flying Cross (United States)
Recipients of the Air Medal
Recipients of the Croix de Guerre (France)
Recipients of the Legion of Honour
United States Army personnel of World War II
United States Military Academy alumni
1902 births
1983 deaths
Burials at Arlington National Cemetery